This is a list of all species that have been found in Texas, United States of America, as of July 17, 2006. It is taken from the Catalogue of Texas Spiders by D. Allen Dean, which was started in 1940. The list contains 980 species in 52 families.

Atypidae
 Sphodros paisano
 Sphodros rufipes

Ctenizidae
 Ummidia absoluta
 Ummidia audouini
 Ummidia beatula
 Ummidia celsa
 Ummidia funerea

Cyrtaucheniidae
 Entychides arizonicus
 Eucteniza relata
 Myrmekiaphila comstocki
 Myrmekiaphila fluviatilis

Dipluridae
 Euagrus chisoseus
 Euagrus comstocki

Theraphosidae
 Aphonopelma anax
 Aphonopelma armada
 Aphonopelma arnoldi
 Aphonopelma breenei
 Aphonopelma clarki
 Aphonopelma echinum
 Aphonopelma gurleyi
 Aphonopelma harlingenum
 Aphonopelma hentzi
 Aphonopelma heterops
 Aphonopelma hollyi
 Aphonopelma marxi
 Aphonopelma moderatum
 Aphonopelma mordax
 Aphonopelma rusticum
 Aphonopelma steindachneri
 Aphonopelma texense
 Aphonopelma waconum

Agelenidae
 Agelenopsis aleenae
 Agelenopsis aperta
 Agelenopsis emertoni
 Agelenopsis kastoni
 Agelenopsis longistyla
 Agelenopsis naevia
 Agelenopsis spatula
 Barronopsis texana
 Malthonica pagana
 Tegenaria domestica
 Tortolena dela

Amaurobiidae
 Coras alabama
 Coras medicinalis

Amphinectidae
 Metaltella simoni

Anyphaenidae
 Anyphaena celer
 Anyphaena dixiana
 Anyphaena fraterna
 Anyphaena lacka
 Anyphaena maculata
 Anyphaena pectorosa
 Hibana arunda
 Hibana cambridgei
 Hibana futilis
 Hibana gracilis
 Hibana incursa
 Hibana velox
 Lupettiana mordax
 Pippuhana calcar
 Wulfila albens
 Wulfila bryantae
 Wulfila saltabundus
 Wulfila tantillus

Araneidae
 Acacesia hamata
 Acanthepeira cherokee
 Acanthepeira stellata
 Allocyclosa bifurca
 Araneus bicentarius
 Araneus bonsallae
 Araneus cavaticus
 Araneus cingulatus
 Araneus cochise
 Araneus detrimentosus
 Araneus gemma
 Araneus illaudatus
 Araneus juniperi
 Araneus kerr
 Araneus marmoreus
 Araneus miniatus
 Araneus nashoba
 Araneus nordmanni
 Araneus pegnia
 Araneus pratensis
 Araneus texanus
 Araneus thaddeus
 Araniella displicata
 Argiope argentata
 Argiope aurantia
 Argiope blanda
 Argiope trifasciata
 Colphepeira catawba
 Cyclosa berlandi
 Cyclosa caroli
 Cyclosa conica
 Cyclosa turbinata
 Cyclosa walckenaeri
 Eriophora edax
 Eriophora ravilla
 Eustala anastera
 Eustala bifida
 Eustala brevispina
 Eustala cameronensis
 Eustala cepina
 Eustala clavispina
 Eustala devia
 Eustala emertoni
 Gasteracantha cancriformis
 Gea heptagon
 Hypsosinga funebris
 Hypsosinga rubens
 Kaira alba
 Kaira altiventer
 Kaira hiteae
 Larinia directa
 Larinioides cornutus
 Larinioides patagiatus
 Larinioides sclopetarius
 Mangora calcarifera
 Mangora fascialata
 Mangora gibberosa
 Mangora maculata
 Mangora placida
 Mangora spiculata
 Mastophora alvareztoroi
 Mastophora cornigera
 Mastophora leucabulba
 Mastophora phrynosoma
 Mastophora stowei
 Mecynogea lemniscata
 Metazygia wittfeldae
 Metazygia zilloides
 Metepeira arizonica
 Metepeira comanche
 Metepeira foxi
 Metepeira labyrinthea
 Metepeira minima
 Micrathena gracilis
 Micrathena mitrata
 Micrathena sagittata
 Neoscona arabesca
 Neoscona crucifera
 Neoscona domiciliorum
 Neoscona nautica
 Neoscona oaxacensis
 Neoscona utahana
 Ocrepeira ectypa
 Ocrepeira georgia
 Ocrepeira globosa
 Ocrepeira redempta
 Scoloderus nigriceps
 Verrucosa arenata
 Wagneriana tauricornis

Caponiidae
 Orthonops lapanus
 Tarsonops systematicus

Clubionidae
 Clubiona abboti
 Clubiona adjacens
 Clubiona catawba
 Clubiona kagani
 Clubiona kiowa
 Clubiona maritima
 Clubiona pygmaea
 Elaver chisosa
 Elaver dorotheae
 Elaver excepta
 Elaver mulaiki
 Elaver texana

Corinnidae
 Castianeira alteranda
 Castianeira amoena
 Castianeira crocata
 Castianeira cubana
 Castianeira descripta
 Castianeira gertschi
 Castianeira longipalpa
 Castianeira occidens
 Castianeira peregrina
 Castianeira trilineata
 Falconina gracilis
 Mazax kaspari
 Mazax pax
 Meriola decepta
 Phrurolithus apertus
 Phrurolithus callidus
 Phrurolithus emertoni
 Phrurolithus leviculus
 Phruronellus formica
 Phrurotimpus alarius
 Phrurotimpus alarius
 Phrurotimpus borealis
 Scotinella fratrella
 Septentrinna bicalcarata
 Trachelas mexicanus
 Trachelas similis
 Trachelas tranquillus
 Trachelas volutus

Ctenidae
 Anahita punctulata
 Ctenus valverdiensis
 Leptoctenus byrrhus

Dictynidae
 Argennina unica
 Brommella lactea
 Cicurina aenigma
 Cicurina arcuata
 Cicurina armadillo
 Cicurina bandera
 Cicurina bandida
 Cicurina baronia
 Cicurina barri
 Cicurina blanco
 Cicurina browni
 Cicurina brunsi
 Cicurina bullis
 Cicurina buwata
 Cicurina caliga
 Cicurina caverna
 Cicurina coryelli
 Cicurina cueva
 Cicurina davisi
 Cicurina delrio
 Cicurina dorothea
 Cicurina ezelli
 Cicurina gruta
 Cicurina hexops
 Cicurina holsingeri
 Cicurina hoodensis
 Cicurina joya
 Cicurina loftini
 Cicurina machete
 Cicurina madla, syn. Cicurina venii
 Cicurina marmorea
 Cicurina mckenziei
 Cicurina medina
 Cicurina menardia
 Cicurina microps
 Cicurina minorata
 Cicurina mirifica
 Cicurina mixmaster
 Cicurina modesta
 Cicurina neovespera
 Cicurina obscura
 Cicurina orellia
 Cicurina pablo
 Cicurina pampa
 Cicurina pastura
 Cicurina patei
 Cicurina platypus
 Cicurina porteri
 Cicurina puentecilla
 Cicurina rainesi
 Cicurina reclusa
 Cicurina reddelli
 Cicurina reyesi
 Cicurina riogrande
 Cicurina robusta
 Cicurina rosae
 Cicurina rudimentops
 Cicurina russelli
 Cicurina sansaba
 Cicurina selecta
 Cicurina serena
 Cicurina sheari
 Cicurina sintonia
 Cicurina sprousei
 Cicurina stowersi
 Cicurina suttoni
 Cicurina texana
 Cicurina travisae
 Cicurina troglobia
 Cicurina ubicki
 Cicurina uvalde
 Cicurina varians
 Cicurina venefica
 Cicurina vespera
 Cicurina vibora
 Cicurina wartoni
 Cicurina watersi
 Dictyna annexa
 Dictyna bellans
 Dictyna bostoniensis
 Dictyna calcarata
 Dictyna cholla
 Dictyna coloradensis
 Dictyna foliacea
 Dictyna formidolosa
 Dictyna personata
 Dictyna secuta
 Dictyna sylvania
 Dictyna terrestris
 Dictyna volucripes
 Emblyna callida
 Emblyna consulta
 Emblyna cruciata
 Emblyna evicta
 Emblyna hentzi
 Emblyna iviei
 Emblyna melva
 Emblyna orbiculata
 Emblyna reticulata
 Emblyna roscida
 Emblyna stulta
 Emblyna sublata
 Lathys delicatula
 Lathys maculina
 Mallos blandus
 Mallos pallidus
 Phantyna bicornis
 Phantyna mulegensis
 Phantyna provida
 Phantyna segregata
 Thallumetus pineus
 Tivyna petrunkevitchi
 Tricholathys knulli

Diguetidae
 Diguetia albolineata
 Diguetia canities
 Diguetia canities
 Diguetia imperiosa

Dysderidae
 Dysdera crocata

Filistatidae
 Filistatinella crassipalpis
 Filistatoides insignis
 Kukulcania arizonica
 Kukulcania hibernalis

Gnaphosidae
 Callilepis chisos
 Callilepis gertschi
 Callilepis imbecilla
 Camillina pulchra
 Cesonia bilineata
 Cesonia sincera
 Drassodes gosiutus
 Drassodes saccatus
 Drassyllus antonito
 Drassyllus aprilinus
 Drassyllus cerrus
 Drassyllus covensis
 Drassyllus creolus
 Drassyllus dixinus
 Drassyllus dromeus
 Drassyllus gynosaphes
 Drassyllus inanus
 Drassyllus lepidus
 Drassyllus mormon
 Drassyllus mumai
 Drassyllus notonus
 Drassyllus orgilus
 Drassyllus prosaphes
 Drassyllus rufulus
 Drassyllus sinton
 Drassyllus texamans
 Eilica bicolor
 Gertschosa amphiloga
 Gnaphosa altudona
 Gnaphosa clara
 Gnaphosa fontinalis
 Gnaphosa sericata
 Haplodrassus chamberlini
 Haplodrassus dixiensis
 Haplodrassus signifer
 Herpyllus bubulcus
 Herpyllus cockerelli
 Herpyllus ecclesiasticus
 Herpyllus gertschi
 Herpyllus hesperolus
 Herpyllus propinquus
 Herpyllus regnans
 Litopyllus temporarius
 Micaria deserticola
 Micaria emertoni
 Micaria gertschi
 Micaria imperiosa
 Micaria langtry
 Micaria longipes
 Micaria mormon
 Micaria nanella
 Micaria nye
 Micaria palliditarsa
 Micaria pasadena
 Micaria pulicaria
 Micaria punctata
 Micaria seminola
 Micaria triangulosa
 Micaria vinnula
 Nodocion eclecticus
 Nodocion floridanus
 Nodocion rufithoracicus
 Scopoides cambridgei
 Scotophaeus blackwalli
 Sergiolus angustus
 Sergiolus bicolor
 Sergiolus capulatus
 Sergiolus cyaneiventris
 Sergiolus lowelli
 Sergiolus minutus
 Sergiolus montanus
 Sergiolus ocellatus
 Sergiolus stella
 Sergiolus tennesseensis
 Sosticus insularis
 Synaphosus paludis
 Synaphosus syntheticus
 Talanites captiosus
 Talanites exlineae
 Trachyzelotes lyonneti
 Urozelotes rusticus
 Zelotes aiken
 Zelotes anglo
 Zelotes duplex
 Zelotes gertschi
 Zelotes hentzi
 Zelotes laetus
 Zelotes lasalanus
 Zelotes lymnophilus
 Zelotes monodens
 Zelotes pseustes
 Zelotes tuobus

Hahniidae
 Hahnia arizonica
 Hahnia cinerea
 Hahnia flaviceps
 Neoantistea agilis
 Neoantistea mulaiki
 Neoantistea oklahomensis
 Neoantistea riparia

Hersiliidae
 Neotama mexicana

Leptonetidae
 Archoleptoneta garza
 Neoleptoneta anopica
 Neoleptoneta bullis
 Neoleptoneta chisosea
 Neoleptoneta coeca
 Neoleptoneta concinna
 Neoleptoneta devia
 Neoleptoneta furtiva
 Neoleptoneta myopica
 Neoleptoneta paraconcinna
 Neoleptoneta uvaldea
 Neoleptoneta valverdae
 Tayshaneta microps

Linyphiidae
 Centromerus latidens
 Ceraticelus emertoni
 Ceraticelus paludigenus
 Ceraticelus paschalis
 Ceraticelus similis
 Ceratinops crenatus
 Ceratinops rugosus
 Ceratinopsis laticeps
 Eperigone albula
 Eperigone antrea
 Eperigone bryantae
 Eperigone eschatologica
 Eperigone maculata
 Eperigone paula
 Eperigone tridentata
 Erigone autumnalis
 Erigone barrowsi
 Erigone dentigera
 Erigone personata
 Eulaira suspecta
 Floricomus mulaiki
 Floricomus ornatulus
 Floricomus rostratus
 Florinda coccinea
 Frontinella communis
 Grammonota inornata
 Grammonota maculata
 Grammonota nigrifrons
 Grammonota suspiciosa
 Grammonota texana
 Grammonota vittata
 Idionella anomala
 Idionella deserta
 Idionella formosa
 Idionella sclerata
 Islandiana flaveola
 Islandiana unicornis
 Jalapyphantes puebla
 Masoncus conspectus
 Meioneta fabra
 Meioneta llanoensis
 Meioneta micaria
 Neriene radiata
 Scylaceus sp.
 Soulgas corticarius
 Styloctetor purpurescens
 Tapinocyba hortensis
 Tennesseellum formica
 Tenuiphantes sabulosus
 Tenuiphantes zebra
 Tutaibo anglicanus
 Walckenaeria puella
 Walckenaeria spiralis

Liocranidae
 Neoanagraphis chamberlini

Lycosidae
 Allocosa absoluta
 Allocosa apora
 Allocosa funerea
 Allocosa furtiva
 Allocosa georgicola
 Allocosa mulaiki
 Allocosa noctuabunda
 Allocosa pylora
 Allocosa retenta
 Alopecosa kochi
 Arctosa littoralis
 Arctosa minuta
 Camptocosa parallela
 Camptocosa texana
 Geolycosa fatifera
 Geolycosa latifrons
 Geolycosa missouriensis
 Geolycosa riograndae
 Geolycosa sepulchralis
 Gladicosa euepigynata
 Gladicosa gulosa
 Gladicosa huberti
 Gladicosa pulchra
 Hesperocosa unica
 Hogna annexa
 Hogna antelucana
 Hogna aspersa
 Hogna baltimoriana
 Hogna carolinensis
 Hogna coloradensis
 Hogna helluo
 Hogna lenta
 Hogna tigana
 Hogna watsoni
 Pardosa atlantica
 Pardosa delicatula
 Pardosa distincta
 Pardosa falcifera
 Pardosa littoralis
 Pardosa mercurialis
 Pardosa milvina
 Pardosa pauxilla
 Pardosa saxatilis
 Pardosa sierra
 Pardosa sternalis
 Pardosa vadosa
 Pardosa zionis
 Pirata alachuus
 Pirata apalacheus
 Pirata davisi
 Pirata felix
 Pirata hiteorum
 Pirata insularis
 Pirata sedentarius
 Pirata seminolus
 Pirata spiniger
 Pirata sylvanus
 Rabidosa hentzi
 Rabidosa punctulata
 Rabidosa rabida
 Schizocosa aulonia
 Schizocosa avida
 Schizocosa bilineata
 Schizocosa crassipes
 Schizocosa mccooki
 Schizocosa ocreata
 Schizocosa perplexa
 Schizocosa retrorsa
 Schizocosa rovneri
 Schizocosa saltatrix
 Schizocosa segregata
 Schizocosa stridulans
 Schizocosa uetzi
 Sosippus texanus
 Trochosa acompa
 Trochosa terricola
 Varacosa avara
 Varacosa gosiuta
 Varacosa parthenus
 Varacosa shenandoa

Mimetidae
 Ero canionis
 Ero pensacolae
 Mimetus haynesi
 Mimetus hesperus
 Mimetus notius
 Mimetus puritanus
 Mimetus syllepsicus

Miturgidae
 Cheiracanthium inclusum
 Strotarchus piscatorius
 Strotarchus planeticus
 Syspira longipes
 Teminius affinis

Mysmenidae
 Calodipoena incredula

Nephilidae
 Nephila clavipes

Nesticidae
 Eidmannella bullata
 Eidmannella delicata
 Eidmannella nasuta
 Eidmannella pallida
 Eidmannella reclusa
 Eidmannella rostrata
 Eidmannella tuckeri
 Gaucelmus augustinus

Oecobiidae
 Oecobius cellariorum
 Oecobius navus
 Oecobius putus

Oonopidae
 Oonops furtivus
 Oonops secretus
 Oonops stylifer
 Opopaea devia
 Opopaea meditata
 Opopaea sedata
 Orchestina saltitans
 Scaphiella hespera
 Scaphiella juvenilis

Oxyopidae
 Hamataliwa grisea
 Hamataliwa helia
 Hamataliwa unca
 Oxyopes acleistus
 Oxyopes aglossus
 Oxyopes apollo
 Oxyopes lynx
 Oxyopes salticus
 Oxyopes scalaris
 Oxyopes tridens
 Peucetia longipalpis
 Peucetia viridans

Philodromidae
 Apollophanes punctipes
 Apollophanes texanus
 Ebo albocaudatus
 Ebo evansae
 Ebo latithorax
 Ebo merkeli
 Ebo mexicanus
 Ebo pepinensis
 Ebo punctatus
 Ebo redneri
 Ebo texanus
 Philodromus alascensis
 Philodromus cespitum
 Philodromus histrio
 Philodromus imbecillus
 Philodromus infuscatus
 Philodromus keyserlingi
 Philodromus laticeps
 Philodromus marginellus
 Philodromus marxi
 Philodromus minutus
 Philodromus montanus
 Philodromus placidus
 Philodromus praelustris
 Philodromus pratariae
 Philodromus rufus
 Philodromus undarum
 Philodromus vulgaris
 Thanatus formicinus
 Thanatus rubicellus
 Thanatus vulgaris
 Tibellus duttoni
 Tibellus oblongus

Pholcidae
 Chisosa diluta
 Crossopriza lyoni
 Micropholcus fauroti
 Modisimus texanus
 Pholcophora texana
 Pholcus phalangioides
 Physocyclus enaulus
 Physocyclus hoogstraali
 Psilochorus coahuilanus
 Psilochorus imitatus
 Psilochorus pallidulus
 Psilochorus redemptus
 Psilochorus utahensis
 Smeringopus pallidus
 Spermophora senoculata

Pisauridae
 Dolomedes albineus
 Dolomedes scriptus
 Dolomedes tenebrosus
 Dolomedes triton
 Dolomedes vittatus
 Pisaurina dubia
 Pisaurina mira
 Tinus peregrinus

Plectreuridae
 Plectreurys sp.

Prodidomidae
 Prodidomus rufus

Salticidae
 Admestina archboldi
 Admestina tibialis
 Sassacus cyaneus
 Anasaitis canosa
 Attidops cutleri
 Attidops youngi
 Bagheera prosper
 Bellota micans
 Bellota wheeleri
 Bredana alternata
 Bredana complicata
 Chalcoscirtus diminutus
 Cheliferoides longimanus
 Cheliferoides segmentatus
 Eris flava
 Eris floridana
 Eris militaris
 Eris rufa
 Ghelna barrowsi
 Ghelna castanea
 Ghelna sexmaculata
 Habronattus calcaratus
 Habronattus coecatus
 Habronattus cognatus
 Habronattus delectus
 Habronattus dorotheae
 Habronattus fallax
 Habronattus forticulus
 Habronattus hirsutus
 Habronattus klauseri
 Habronattus mataxus
 Habronattus mexicanus
 Habronattus moratus
 Habronattus orbus
 Habronattus sugillatus
 Habronattus texanus
 Habronattus tranquillus
 Habronattus tuberculatus
 Habronattus virgulatus
 Habronattus viridipes
 Hasarius adansoni
 Hentzia mitrata
 Hentzia palmarum
 Lyssomanes viridis
 Maevia inclemens
 Maevia poultoni
 Marpissa bryantae
 Marpissa dentoides
 Marpissa formosa
 Marpissa lineata
 Marpissa obtusa
 Marpissa pikei
 Menemerus bivittatus
 Messua limbata
 Metacyrba punctata
 Metacyrba taeniola
 Metaphidippus chera
 Metaphidippus felix
 Metaphidippus longipalpus
 Metaphidippus texanus
 Mexigonus minutus
 Naphrys acerba
 Naphrys pulex
 Neon nelli
 Neonella vinnula
 Paradamoetas formicinus
 Paramarpissa piratica
 Paraphidippus aurantius
 Paraphidippus fartilis
 Peckhamia americana
 Peckhamia picata
 Peckhamia scorpiona
 Pelegrina arizonensis
 Pelegrina chalceola
 Pelegrina exigua
 Pelegrina galathea
 Pelegrina peckhamorum
 Pelegrina pervaga
 Pelegrina proterva
 Pelegrina sabinema
 Pelegrina tillandsiae
 Pellenes limatus
 Phidippus apacheanus
 Phidippus arizonensis
 Phidippus asotus
 Phidippus audax
 Phidippus bidentatus
 Phidippus californicus
 Phidippus cardinalis
 Phidippus carneus
 Phidippus carolinensis
 Phidippus clarus
 Phidippus comatus
 Phidippus mystaceus
 Phidippus octopunctatus
 Phidippus otiosus
 Phidippus phoenix
 Phidippus pius
 Phidippus princeps
 Phidippus pruinosus
 Phidippus putnami
 Phidippus texanus
 Phidippus tyrannus
 Phidippus vexans
 Phidippus whitmani
 Phlegra hentzi
 Platycryptus undatus
 Plexippus paykulli
 Poultonella alboimmaculata
 Poultonella nuecesensis
 Rhetenor texanus
 Salticus austinensis
 Salticus peckhamae
 Salticus scenicus
 Sarinda hentzi
 Sassacus papenhoei
 Sassacus vitis
 Sitticus concolor
 Sitticus dorsatus
 Sitticus welchi
 Synageles bishopi
 Synageles noxiosus
 Synemosyna formica
 Talavera minuta
 Colonus puerperus
 Colonus sylvanus
 Zygoballus nervosus
 Zygoballus rufipes
 Zygoballus sexpunctatus

Scytodidae
 Scytodes dorothea
 Scytodes perfecta
 Scytodes thoracica
 Scytodes zapatana

Segestriidae
 Ariadna bicolor

Selenopidae
 Selenops actophilus

Sicariidae
 Loxosceles apachea
 Loxosceles blanda
 Loxosceles devia
 Loxosceles reclusa
 Loxosceles rufescens

Sparassidae
 Heteropoda venatoria
 Olios fasciculatus

Symphtognathidae
 Anapistula secreta

Tetragnathidae
 Azilia affinis
 Glenognatha foxi
 Leucauge venusta
 Metellina mimetoides
 Pachygnatha tristriata
 Tetragnatha caudata
 Tetragnatha elongata
 Tetragnatha guatemalensis
 Tetragnatha laboriosa
 Tetragnatha nitens
 Tetragnatha pallescens
 Tetragnatha straminea
 Tetragnatha vermiformis
 Tetragnatha versicolor
 Tetragnatha viridis

Theridiidae
 Achaearanea canionensis
 Achaearanea florendida
 Achaearanea globosa
 Achaearanea insulsa
 Achaearanea porteri
 Achaearanea schullei
 Achaearanea tepidariorum
 Anelosimus studiosus
 Argyrodes elevatus
 Argyrodes pluto
 Chrosiothes jocosus
 Chrosiothes minusculus
 Chrysso albomaculata
 Coleosoma acutiventer
 Crustulina altera
 Crustulina sticta
 Dipoena abdita
 Dipoena cathedralis
 Dipoena nigra
 Emertonella taczanowskii
 Enoplognatha caricis
 Enoplognatha marmorata
 Episinus cognatus
 Euryopis lineatipes
 Euryopis mulaiki
 Euryopis quinquemaculata
 Euryopis spinigera
 Euryopis texana
 Faiditus americanus
 Faiditus cancellatus
 Faiditus caudatus
 Faiditus davisi
 Faiditus globosus
 Faiditus subdolus
 Keijia alabamensis
 Keijia antoni
 Keijia mneon
 Keijia punctosparsa
 Latrodectus geometricus
 Latrodectus hesperus
 Latrodectus mactans
 Latrodectus variolus
 Neospintharus furcatus
 Neospintharus trigonum
 Nesticodes rufipes
 Phoroncidia americana
 Phycosoma lineatipes
 Rhomphaea fictilium
 Rhomphaea projiciens
 Spintharus flavidus
 Steatoda alamosa
 Steatoda americana
 Steatoda borealis
 Steatoda fulva
 Steatoda mexicana
 Steatoda punctulata
 Steatoda quadrimaculata
 Steatoda transversa
 Steatoda triangulosa
 Steatoda variata
 Steatoda variata
 Stemmops bicolor
 Takayus lyricus
 Theridion australe
 Theridion cameronense
 Theridion cinctipes
 Theridion cynicum
 Theridion differens
 Theridion dilutum
 Theridion dividuum
 Theridion flavonotatum
 Theridion frondeum
 Theridion glaucescens
 Theridion goodnightorum
 Theridion hidalgo
 Theridion llano
 Theridion murarium
 Theridion myersi
 Theridion positivum
 Theridion rabuni
 Theridion submissum
 Theridula opulenta
 Thymoites expulsus
 Thymoites illudens
 Thymoites marxi
 Thymoites missionensis
 Thymoites pallidus
 Thymoites unimaculatus
 Tidarren haemorrhoidale
 Tidarren sisyphoides
 Wamba crispulus

Thomisidae
 Bassaniana floridana
 Bassaniana utahensis
 Bassaniana versicolor
 Majellula sp.
 Misumena vatia
 Misumenoides formosipes
 Misumenops asperatus
 Misumenops californicus
 Misumenops carletonicus
 Misumenops celer
 Misumenops coloradensis
 Misumenops dubius
 Misumenops oblongus
 Modysticus modestus
 Ozyptila americana
 Ozyptila hardyi
 Ozyptila monroensis
 Synema parvulum
 Synema viridans
 Tmarus angulatus
 Tmarus floridensis
 Tmarus rubromaculatus
 Tmarus unicus
 Xysticus apachecus
 Xysticus aprilinus
 Xysticus auctificus
 Xysticus coloradensis
 Xysticus concursus
 Xysticus elegans
 Xysticus ellipticus
 Xysticus emertoni
 Xysticus ferox
 Xysticus fraternus
 Xysticus funestus
 Xysticus furtivus
 Xysticus gulosus
 Xysticus lassanus
 Xysticus locuples
 Xysticus nevadensis
 Xysticus pellax
 Xysticus punctatus
 Xysticus robinsoni
 Xysticus texanus

Titanoecidae
 Titanoeca americana
 Titanoeca nigrella
 Titanoeca nivalis

Uloboridae
 Hyptiotes cavatus
 Hyptiotes puebla
 Miagrammopes mexicanus
 Octonoba sinensis
 Philoponella oweni
 Philoponella semiplumosa
 Uloborus glomosus
 Uloborus segregatus

Zoridae
 Zora pumila

Zorocratidae
 Zorocrates aemulus
 Zorocrates alternatus
 Zorocrates isolatus

Spiders
Texas
Texas
.Texas